is a dam in Nabari, Mie Prefecture, Japan, completed in 1970. It is located about 2 miles west of Hinachi Dam, which is actually on a different branch of the Nabari River.

References 

Dams in Mie Prefecture
Dams completed in 1970